General elections were held in the Dominican Republic on 16 May 1978. Following diplomatic pressure from American President Jimmy Carter, the elections were free and competitive and contested by all political parties, unlike the previous elections in the 1970s. Antonio Guzmán Fernández won the presidential election, whilst his Dominican Revolutionary Party (which had not contested the 1970 and 1974 elections) won the Congressional elections. Voter turnout was 75.8%.

When counting showed an unmistakable trend toward Guzmán, the Army attempted a coup and interrupted the vote count, only to back down amid protests at home and strong pressure from abroad.  The final count showed Balaguer had suffered the first defeat of his career. Although Guzmán was allowed to assume the presidency, the Central Elections Authority redistributed the uncast votes equally between the PRD and the Reformist Party, diminishing the PRD's majority in Congress.

Guzmán's swearing-in on 16 August marked the first time in the country's history that a sitting government had peacefully surrendered power to an elected member of the opposition.

Results

President

Congress

References

Dominican Republic
1978 in the Dominican Republic
Elections in the Dominican Republic
Presidential elections in the Dominican Republic
Election and referendum articles with incomplete results
May 1978 events in North America